The Trenton Formation is a geologic formation in Canada and Michigan, Ohio, and Indiana in the United States. It preserves fossils dating back to the Ordovician period.

See also
 List of fossiliferous stratigraphic units in Michigan
 Trenton Gas Field
 Indiana gas boom
 Petroleum industry in Ohio

References

 

Ordovician System of North America
Ordovician Michigan
Ordovician geology of New York (state)
Ordovician geology of Virginia
Ordovician southern paleotemperate deposits
Middle Ordovician Series